Attacus erebus is a moth of family Saturniidae. It is native to Sulawesi (Indonesia). This variety is bred locally and shipped worldwide to butterfly farms.

Adult males are highly variable.

The life cycle of erebus is very similar to that of most other Attacus species.

References

 "Attacus erebus", Insect Life Forms

Saturniidae
Moths described in 1904
Moths of Indonesia